Do Bhai  (English: The Two Brothers) is a 1947 Indian Bollywood film directed by Munshi Dil. Its starred Ulhas, Kamini Kaushal, Dipak Mukherjee, Tiwari, Rajan Haksar and Paro Devi in lead roles. It was the second highest grossing Indian film of 1947.

Cast
 Ulhas
 Kamini Kaushal
 Dipak Mukherjee
 Tiwari
 Rajan Haksar
 Paro Devi
 S. B. Nayampalli
 Abdul Majeed
 Kanta Kumari
 Vikram Kapoor
 Afghan Shadow
 Baby Tara

Soundtrack

Music composed by S. D. Burman, lyrics written by Raja Mehdi Ali Khan.

 Aa Jaa Koi Pukare Tere Bagair Sune Hai - Geeta Dutt
 Aji Preet Ka Naata Toot Gaya - Geeta Dutt, G. M. Durrani
 Amwa Ki Dali Pe Koyal Bole - Paro Devi
 Duniya Me Mere Aaj, Andhera Hi Andhera - Mohammed Rafi
 Hamen Chhod Piya Kis Des Gaye - Geeta Dutt
 Kabhi Bhule Se Na Puchi Man Ki Baat - Paro Devi
 Mere Piya To Base Pardes Re - Geeta Dutt
 Yaad Karoge, Ek Din Hum Ko Yaad Karoge - Geeta Dutt
 Yaad Rakhna Mujhe Yaad Rakhna - Geeta Dutt, K. S. Ragi

Geeta Dutt (née Roy), who had no formal training in music,  sang two lines in a chorus in the film Bhakt Prahlad (1946). On hearing her voice, S.D. Burman persuaded her father to let her sing in his forthcoming film Do Bhai (1947). The first song to be recorded for the film in her voice was ‘Humein chod piya kis des gaye’. She sang six out of the nine songs of the film. From them the songs "Mera Sundar Sapna Beet Gaya"  and "Yaad Karoge"  became enduring hits.

References

External links
 

1947 films
Films scored by S. D. Burman
1940s Hindi-language films
Indian drama films
Indian black-and-white films
1947 drama films